Lori Johns (born 1965) is a former Top Fuel Dragster racer. She won rookie of the year in 1985 and in 1990 became the third woman to win a NHRA Top Fuel event after Shirley Muldowney (1976) and Lucille Lee (1982).

History 
Johns was born in Corpus Christi, Texas.

At a Competition Eliminator event in Baton Rouge, Louisiana in May 1986, Johns suffered a serious injury after a Jim Van Cleve's gas dragster climbed a guardrail, flipped, and landed on her, breaking her back and neck, which left her out of competition for two years. After undergoing five surgeries, Johns attended Frank Hawley's Drag Racing School.

Blaming Van Cleve for the accident, her father, Terry (a car dealer), sued. The suit was ultimately dropped, at Johns' request.

After learning to drive an alcohol dragster, Johns went into Top Fuel racing, in a new car, supplied by her father, at a cost of US$125,000.

At the time, she had entered only ten Top Fuel races, and had never reached a final round.

In 1991, as qualifications for the U.S. Nationals began, she was fourth in the standings.

She had a Revell model kit (#7496) of Johns' Jolly Rancher dragster. She was also the subject of an official NHRA trading card.

Notes

External links 
 Tulsaworld.com
 Officialize.com/

1965 births
Dragster drivers
People from Corpus Christi, Texas
American female racing drivers
Female dragster drivers
Living people
Racing drivers from Texas
21st-century American women